Josef Gabriel Rheinberger (17 March 1839 – 25 November 1901) was a Liechtensteiner organist and composer, residing in Bavaria for most of his life.

Life 
Josef Gabriel Rheinberger, whose father was the treasurer for Aloys II, Prince of Liechtenstein, showed exceptional musical talent at an early age.

When only seven years old, he was already serving as organist of the Vaduz parish church, and his first composition was performed the following year. In 1849, he studied with composer Philipp M. Schmutzer (31 December 1821 – 17 November 1898) in Feldkirch, Vorarlberg.

In 1851, his father, who had initially opposed his son's desire to embark on the life of a professional musician, relented and allowed him to enter the Munich Conservatorium. Not long after graduating, he became professor of piano and of composition at the same institution. When this first version of the Munich Conservatorium was dissolved, he was appointed répétiteur at the Court Theatre, from which he resigned in 1867.

Rheinberger married his former pupil, the poet and socialite Franziska "Fanny" von Hoffnaass (eight years his senior) in 1867. The couple remained childless, but the marriage was happy. Franziska wrote the texts for much of her husband's vocal work.

The stylistic influences on Rheinberger ranged from contemporaries such as Brahms to composers from earlier times, such as Mendelssohn, Schumann, Schubert and, above all, Bach. He was also an enthusiast for painting and literature (especially English and German).

In 1877, he was appointed court conductor, responsible for the music in the royal chapel. He was subsequently awarded an honorary doctorate by Ludwig Maximilian University of Munich. A distinguished teacher, he numbered many Americans among his pupils, including Horatio Parker, William Berwald, George Whitefield Chadwick, Bruno Klein, Sidney Homer and Henry Holden Huss. Other students of his included important figures from Europe: Italian composer Ermanno Wolf-Ferrari, Serbian composer Stevan Stojanovic Mokranjac, and German composers Engelbert Humperdinck and Richard Strauss and the conductor (and composer) Wilhelm Furtwängler.  When the second (and present) Munich Conservatorium was founded, Rheinberger was appointed Royal Professor of organ and composition, a post he held for the rest of his life.

On 31 December 1892 his wife died, after suffering a long illness. Two years later, poor health led him to give up the post of Court Music Director.

Rheinberger was a prolific composer. His religious works include twelve Masses (one for double chorus, three for four voices a cappella, three for women's voices and organ, two for men's voices and one with orchestra), a Requiem and a Stabat Mater. His other works include several operas, symphonies, chamber music, and choral works.

Today Rheinberger is remembered above all for his elaborate and challenging organ compositions; these include two concertos, 20 sonatas in 20 different keys (of a projected set of 24 sonatas in all the keys), 22 trios, and 36 solo pieces. His organ sonatas were once declared to be

Rheinberger died in 1901 in Munich, and was buried in the Alter Südfriedhof. His grave was destroyed during World War II, and his remains were moved to his home town of Vaduz in 1950.

Compositions

This list only mentions works that were assigned an opus number by Rheinberger himself.
 Sacred vocal works
 Cantatas, including the Christmas cantata Der Stern von Bethlehem (The Star of Bethlehem), Op. 164
 14 masses, including the 1881 Mass in A major, Op. 126, 3 requiem settings, 2 settings of the Stabat mater
 Motets, hymns, lieder
 among others, Abendlied (Op. 69, Nr. 3) after Luke 24,29 (Bleib bei uns)
 Dramatic works
 2 operas (Die sieben Raben, Op. 20, after the Grimm fairy tale The Seven Ravens, Türmers Töchterlein, Op. 70)
 3 Singspiele
 2 pieces of incidental music
 Secular choral music
 Choir ballads
 Choral pieces with and without accompaniment
 Works for mixed choir
 e.g., Waldblumen (Op. 124) – eight songs after texts by 
 Works for female and male choirs
 12 lieder for Voice and Piano
 Orchestral music
 2 symphonies
 3 overtures
 Piano concerto in A-flat, Op. 94 (1877)
 3 other concertos for instruments with orchestra (including two concertos for organ and orchestra)
 Chamber music
 String quartets, string quintets, piano trios, sonatas for solo instruments and piano
 e.g., Clarinet Sonata, Op. 105 in A major
 4 piano sonatas
 Works for organ
 2 organ concertos
 20 organ sonatas
 12 Fughettas, Op. 123
 12 Monologues, Op. 162
 12 Meditations, Op. 167
 Preludes, trios, character pieces
 Works for solo instruments (violin and oboe) with organ

Recordings
Rheinberger: Missae et Cantiones, Wolfgang Schäfer Choir Director, Edgar Krapp Organ, Klaus Mertens Baritone, Frankfurter Kantorei, Carus-Verlag 1998
Rheinberger: Organ Sonatas Nos. 2, 3, 4, 5, 6, 8, 11, 12, 16, 17, 19, 20: Bruce Stevens, organ; Raven Recordings; 4 CDs
Josef Gabriel Rheinberger: Motets, Masses and Hymns, Elizabeth Patterson, Director; Gloriae Dei Cantores; Paraclete Recordings 2011
Rheinberger: Geistliche Vokalmusik, Stuttgart Chamber Choir; Carus; 10 CDs
Rheinberger: Klavierwerke, Jürg Hanselmann; Carus; 10 CDs; 2011
The Complete Organ Sonatas of Josef Rheinberger – Roger Sayer plays The Organ of The Temple Church, London, Roger Sayer organ; Priory Records; 6 CDs; 2018
Rheinberger: Music for Voice and Organ, Patrick Parker, organ, Katie Pollorena, mezzo-soprano, Seven Eight Records, 2019.
Rheinberger: Sacred Choral Works, Phoenix Bach Choir, Kansas City Chorale, Charles Bruffy, conductor; Chandos Records, 2007.

References

Other sources

External links
 Internationale Josef Gabriel Rheinberger Gesellschaft – list of works

Free scores
 
 e-Partitions Newly edited and typeset organ scores.

Commercial publishers

 Carus Verlag – complete works
 Editions Silvertrust – chamber music only

Free recordings

 Free recordings by Umeå Academic Choir:
 Kyrie
 Gloria
Rheinberger: Music for Voice and Organ, Patrick Parker, organ, Katie Pollorena, mezzo-soprano

1839 births
1901 deaths
19th-century classical composers
19th-century German composers
19th-century German male musicians
20th-century classical composers
20th-century German composers
20th-century German male musicians
Burials at the Alter Südfriedhof
Catholic liturgical composers
Composers for pipe organ
German classical organists
German male classical composers
German opera composers
German Roman Catholics
German Romantic composers
Liechtenstein composers
Liechtenstein Roman Catholics
Male opera composers
German male organists
People from Vaduz
Male classical organists
19th-century organists